Morpho granadensis, the Granada morpho, is a Neotropical butterfly that is primarily found in Costa Rica. Several subspecies and many forms have been described. It is considered, by some authors, to be a subspecies of Morpho deidamia. Morpho granadensis is exceedingly rare in museum collections and the type specimen is from Costa Rica. The species is narrowly restricted in Costa Rica to band of tropical rain forest within 100 to 600 meters elevation along the Caribbean watershed of the Cordillera Central and the adjacent highlands. Several studies show that Morpho granadensis is half as abundant as other species like Morpho peleides.

Etymology
The first specimen collected on the voyage of the Navarra was from Neu Granada.

See also 
 Morpho Menelaus

References

Le Moult (E.) & Réal (P.), 1962-1963. Les Morpho d'Amérique du Sud et Centrale, Editions du cabinet entomologique E. Le Moult, Paris.

External links
Taxonomy Browser Upperside and underside photographs.
Butterflies of America Images of type and other specimens of Morpho deidamia granadensis.

Morpho
Nymphalidae of South America